Philip Kimely Boit (born 12 December 1971 in Eldoret, Kenya) is a cross-country skier and the first Kenyan to participate in the Winter Olympics. His first name is sometimes spelled as "Phillip".

1996–98
Philip Boit and compatriot Henry Bitok trained in Finland to become competitive skiers. Both were former middle distance runners with no previous skiing experience. Their project was sponsored by sportswear giant Nike. Winter training began in February 1996. Kenya had only one slot for the 1998 Winter Olympics in Nagano, which was taken by Boit, while Bitok finished his skiing career soon after. Boit's participation in the games gained worldwide media coverage. He finished 92nd and last in the 10-kilometer classic race. The awards for the race were delayed while winner Bjørn Dæhlie waited for Boit to reach the finish line to embrace him. The experience was so moving for Boit that he named one of his sons Dæhlie Boit.

1999
Boit participated in the 1999 Nordic skiing World Championships in Ramsau, Austria, and again finished last in the 10 km classic event. After the event, Nike dropped their sponsorship and Boit was forced to settle for "dry training" in Kenya for the next two years.

2002–10
In the 2002 Winter Olympics in Salt Lake City Boit finished 64th in the sprint race, beating three competitors. After the Salt Lake City Olympics Boit left competitive skiing again, but came back to participate in the 2006 Winter Olympics in Turin where he finished 92nd in the 15 km Classic, ahead of five fellow competitors. Boit said in a 2006 interview that he was planning to retire after 2010 Winter Olympics to be held in Vancouver.

In 2007, he competed in the World Ski Championships held in Sapporo, Japan, the same country where he started his Olympic career.

2010–11
Boit had planned to retire after the 2010 Winter Olympics. However, he did not meet the requirements needed to start in the Games as he missed the limit by two FIS points. His attempts to qualify for the Olympics had been hampered by illness. After missing the Olympics, Boit decided to continue his career by a year and retire after the 2011 World Championships to be held in Oslo, Norway. Boit finished 42nd during qualification, and therefore was unable to compete in the 15 kilometre classical.

Education
After graduating from Samwayi Secondary School, he was recruited to General Service Unit in 1992, where was able to enhance his athletics career. As an athlete, he was a bit behind the top Kenyan runners. His 800 meter personal best is 1:46.06.

Family
Philip's uncle Mike Boit won the bronze medal in the 800 meters at the 1972 Summer Olympics in Munich.

See also 
 Lamine Guèye (skier)
 Eddie "The Eagle" Edwards
 Eric Moussambani
 Paula Barila Bolopa

References 

 
 
 
 
 Kenya: It's Not Just for Runners Anymore
 Igrzyska jednak nie dla Boita. Krowy też nie 
 

Living people
1971 births
People from Uasin Gishu County
Kenyan male cross-country skiers
Kenyan male middle-distance runners
Olympic cross-country skiers of Kenya
Cross-country skiers at the 1998 Winter Olympics
Cross-country skiers at the 2002 Winter Olympics
Cross-country skiers at the 2006 Winter Olympics